William Wilson Humphries (1 July 1928 – 22 October 1992) was a Scottish footballer and manager who played as an inside forward. He began his playing career with Motherwell, where he played for ten years and won both Scottish domestic cup competitions. He later played for St Mirren, Dundee United and Hamilton Academical before returning to St Mirren for a two-year spell as manager. During his playing career, Humphries made one appearance each for the Scotland national team and the Scottish Football League XI.

Career
Humphries was born in Motherwell in 1928 and began his career with his hometown club Motherwell in the mid-1940s straight from Dalziel High School. He spent a decade with the club, making just under 200 league appearances and scoring 68 goals. Humphries won both domestic cups during his time at Fir Park, winning the Scottish League Cup in 1950 and the Scottish Cup in 1952. Shortly after the Scottish Cup win, in which Humphries scored, he received his only Scotland cap, appearing in a 3–1 defeat in Sweden. Humphries also appeared in the Scottish Football League XI in 1952. In 1954, during Motherwell's record 12–1 win over Dundee United, Humphries netted six goals, another club record.

In 1956 Humphries moved to St Mirren, before joining Dundee United a year later, where he spent two years and scored 33 times in 54 league appearances. He left in 1959 and joined Hamilton Academical, where he spent the final two years of his playing career. After retiring from playing, Humphries returned to Motherwell as a part-time member of the coaching staff, where he remained throughout the 1960s. In 1970, Humphries returned to St Mirren as manager but his two-year spell included relegation in 1971 and he resigned the following year.

Humphries helped form the Motherwell Former Players Club in 1988. One of the South Stand corporate boxes at the club's ground, Fir Park, is named after him. He died in 1992.

References

External links
 
Wilson Humphries at MotherWELLnet

1928 births
1992 deaths
Footballers from Motherwell
Scottish footballers
Scottish Football League players
Scotland international footballers
Motherwell F.C. players
Motherwell F.C. non-playing staff
Scottish schoolteachers
Alumni of the University of Glasgow
St Mirren F.C. players
Dundee United F.C. players
Hamilton Academical F.C. players
Scottish football managers
St Mirren F.C. managers
Scottish Football League representative players
Association football inside forwards
Scottish Football League managers
People educated at Dalziel High School